is a Japanese professional Nippon Professional Baseball player. He is currently with the Saitama Seibu Lions in Japan's Pacific League.

External links

1972 births
Living people
Baseball people from Fukui Prefecture
Japanese baseball players
Chunichi Dragons players
Seibu Lions players
Saitama Seibu Lions players